The South East Network for Social Sciences (SeNSS) is a consortium of ten universities in the UK. All pioneers and world leaders in social-science research, knowledge production and training, the universities cooperate under ESRC to provide funding, expertise and an arena for Social Science and Economics researchers; their ESRC funding was announced in August 2016 after SeNSS's 2015 foundation. In 2016, SAGE Publishing revealed that it would begin a partnership with SeNSS.

Member institutions

SeNSS members are:
City, University of London
University of East Anglia
University of Essex (the co-ordinating institution)
Goldsmiths, University of London
University of Kent
University of Reading
University of Roehampton, London
Royal Holloway, University of London
University of Surrey
University of Sussex

Activities
The SeNSS is funded by the ESRC and provides funding for PhD students in the social sciences, training and workshops as well as a yearly conference. SeNSS also provides post-doctoral fellowships, placements and researcher support; SeNSS started accepting applicants in 2017.

SeNSS focuses on providing inter-disciplinary research training through engaging its scholars with expertise drawn from different scholarly fields.

References

College and university associations and consortia in the United Kingdom
Social sciences organizations
Scientific organisations based in the United Kingdom
2015 establishments in the United Kingdom
Scientific organizations established in 2015
South East England